Bernard King (born 1956) is an American basketball player who played in the National Basketball Association from 1977 to 1993.

Bernard King may also refer to:

Bernard King (basketball, born 1981) (born 1981), American basketball player
Bernard King (television) (1934–2002), Australian stage actor, celebrity chef and television personality

See also
King (surname)